Sun Rivers is a community located on the northeastern side of Kamloops, BC on the Kamloops Indian Band Reserve against Mount Peter and Mount Paul.  It is located east on Highway 5 near the junction with the Trans Canada Highway.  It is developed around the Sun Rivers golf course.

External links
 Sun Rivers Community Resort

Indian reserves in British Columbia